From 1822 to 1849, Augusta College was located in Augusta, Kentucky in Bracken County.  It was formed when the Bracken Academy and Methodist churches of Ohio and Kentucky joined.  Augusta College was the third Methodist college founded in the United States.  Its first president was Martin Ruter, D.D. It usually had enrollment of about 175–305 pupils.

Notable alumni and faculty
Henry Bidleman Bascom (1796–1850), religious circuit rider, U.S. Congressional Chaplain, Methodist Bishop, professor at Augusta College, college president, editor
James H. Brown (1818–1900), Justice of the West Virginia Supreme Court
Orville Hickman Browning (1806-1881), member of the United States Senate from Illinois; United States Secretary of the Interior
Alexander William Doniphan (1808-1887), was a 19th-century American attorney, soldier and politician from Missouri who is best known today as the man who prevented the summary execution of Joseph Smith, founder of the Church of Jesus Christ of Latter-day Saints.
John Price Durbin (1800-1876), Chaplain of the Senate, President of Dickinson College
John Gregg Fee (1816-1901), abolitionist and founder of Berea College
Edward J. Gay (1816-1889) and Edward White Robertson (1823–1887), both of whom went on to become United States representatives from Louisiana
Randolph S. Foster, minister and later president of Northwestern University (IL) and Drew University (NJ)
John Miley, professor of theology at Drew University
 Charles Clark, 24th Governor of Mississippi.
Selucius Garfielde (1822-1883), Territorial Delegate to Congress from Washington Territory
Bela M. Hughes (1817-1902), Lawyer and Colorado pioneer
Charles S. Lewis  (1821 - 1878), U.S. Representative from Virginia
Francis Asbury Morris (1817 – 1881), Attorney General of the Republic of Texas and circuit riding minister.
Elijah Phister, U.S. Congressman from Kentucky
William H. Wadsworth, U.S. Congressman from Kentucky

Waitman T. Willey (1811-1900), U.S. Senator from West Virginia

See also 
 :Category:Augusta College (Kentucky) alumni

References

Bibliography

Defunct private universities and colleges in Kentucky
Universities and colleges affiliated with the United Methodist Church
Education in Bracken County, Kentucky
Educational institutions established in 1822
Educational institutions disestablished in 1849
1822 establishments in Kentucky
1849 disestablishments in the United States
Universities and colleges affiliated with the Methodist Episcopal Church
Augusta, Kentucky